Jessica Chen Weiss is an American author and political scientist who specializes in China–United States relations. She is currently the Michael J. Zak Professor for China and Asia-Pacific Studies at Cornell University in the government department. 

She is the author of the 2014 book Powerful Patriots: Nationalist Protest in China’s Foreign Relations.

Early life and education 
Weiss was born and grew up in Seattle, Washington. She obtained a bachelor of arts degree from Stanford University in 2003 and attended the University of California, San Diego, graduating in 2008 with a PhD.

Career 
In 2014, Oxford University Press published her book Powerful Patriots: Nationalist Protest in China’s Foreign Relations. 

She was senior advisor to the United States Department of State's Policy Planning Staff from August 2021 to July 2022. She is the Michael J. Zak Professor for China and Asia-Pacific Studies at Cornell University in the government department.

She has advocated for the American government to avoid an "overly confrontational" approach to its relations with China. An August 2022 article she wrote in Foreign Affairs espousing this approach was described byThe New Yorker as catapulting Wiess "to the front ranks of the growing number of China experts concerned that U.S. foreign policy suffers from an unhealthy focus on China as a threat."

Selected publications 

 Powerful Patriots: Nationalist Protest in China’s Foreign Relations. 2014, Oxford University Press ISBN 9780199387557

References

Further reading

External links 

 Jessica Chen Weiss on Twitter

Cornell University faculty
University of California, San Diego alumni
People from Seattle
Year of birth missing (living people)
Living people
Stanford University alumni
21st-century American women writers
Political science writers
United States Department of State officials
21st-century American writers
American political scientists
Political scientists on China